This is a list of the tallest buildings in Gurgaon, in the northern Indian state of Haryana. Gurgaon is one of the fastest-growing cities in the Delhi NCR as well as in India. Gurgaon is currently home to more than 1,800 completed High-rise buildings.  Raheja Revanta topped out in 2020 is currently the tallest building in Gurgaon.

List of tallest buildings 
This list ranks the tallest completed and topped out buildings in Gurgaon that stand at least  as of June 2022. This includes spires and architectural details but does not include antenna masts.

List of tallest buildings Under Construction 
This list ranks buildings that are under construction in the city of Gurgaon and are planned to rise at least  or 25 floors or more.This includes spires and architectural details but does not include antenna masts.

See also 
List of tallest buildings in different cities in India

References

Gurgaon
Buildings and structures in Gurgaon
Tallest buildings in Gurgaon